Warren's tree frog (Tepuihyla warreni) is a species of frog in the family Hylidae found in Guyana and possibly Brazil and Venezuela. Its natural habitats are subtropical or tropical moist montane forests, rivers, freshwater marshes, and intermittent freshwater marshes.

Originally placed in the genus Hyla because its true relationships were unknown, it has since been placed in the genus Tepuihyla.

References

Hyla
Tepuihyla
Amphibians of Guyana
Amphibians described in 1992
Taxonomy articles created by Polbot